Philippe Housiaux (born 10 December 1947) is a Belgian sprinter. He competed in the men's 100 metres at the 1968 Summer Olympics.

References

1947 births
Living people
Athletes (track and field) at the 1968 Summer Olympics
Belgian male sprinters
Belgian male long jumpers
Olympic athletes of Belgium
Place of birth missing (living people)